Eric Fredrik Alexander Leksell (born 14 November 1997) is a Swedish footballer who plays for FC Trollhättan as a defender.

References

External links

 

1997 births
Living people
IFK Göteborg players
GAIS players
FC Trollhättan players
Swedish footballers
Allsvenskan players
Superettan players
Place of birth missing (living people)
Association football defenders